Molecular Reproduction and Development is a peer-reviewed scientific journal that publishes research articles on developmental and reproductive biology. The journal was established in 1978 under the name Gamete Research and the current name was adopted in 1988. The editor-in-chief is Harvey Florman (University of Massachusetts Chan Medical School). According to the Journal Citation Reports, the journal has a 2020 impact factor of 2.609.

References

External links 
 

Publications established in 1978
Developmental biology journals
Wiley-Liss academic journals
English-language journals
Monthly journals